R. J. Barker is a British author of fantasy literature. He is best known for his Wounded Kingdom trilogy and the Tide Child trilogy.

Career
Barker is from Leeds, England. He played in a band for many years before realizing he "was never a very good musician", after which he turned to literature.

Barker served as a judge for the 2018 James White Award.

In 2021, Barker sold a new fantasy series entitled The Forsaken trilogy to Orbit Books, with a planned release for 2022.

Personal life

Barker has Crohn's disease. He has used his personal experiences to explore the presentation of disabled characters in fantasy literature.

Reception and awards

Age of Assassins, the first book in the Wounded Kingdom trilogy, was nominated for the 2018 British Fantasy Award for Best Novel and the 2018 Morningstar Award for Best Fantasy Newcomer.

The Bone Ships, the first book in the Tide Child trilogy, won the 2020 British Fantasy Award for Best Novel.

Bibliography

Wounded Kingdom trilogy
 Age of Assassins (2017)
 Blood of Assassins (2018)
 King of Assassins (2018)

Tide Child Trilogy
 The Bone Ships (2019)
 Call of the Bone Ships (2020)
 The Bone Ship's Wake (2021)

References

English fantasy writers
Writers with disabilities
Year of birth missing (living people)
Living people